Coopers is an unincorporated community in Baldwin County, in the U.S. state of Georgia.

History
The community was named after Thomas Jefferson Cooper.

References

Unincorporated communities in Baldwin County, Georgia
Unincorporated communities in Georgia (U.S. state)